Gregg is a masculine given name, sometimes a short form (hypocorism) of Gregory. It may refer to:

 Gregg Alexander, American singer/songwriter and producer born Gregory Aiuto in 1970
 Gregg Allman (1947–2017), American singer-songwriter, musician, co-founder of The Allman Brothers Band
 Gregg Amore (born 1966), American politician
 Gregg Butler (born 1952), American football player
 Gregg Carr (born 1962), American former National Football League player
 Gregg Cunningham (born 1949), American politician
 Gregg Dechert (born 1952), Canadian former keyboardist of Uriah Heep
 Gregg Doyel, American sports writer
 Gregg Edelman (born 1958), American movie, television and theater actor
 Gregg Hale (producer), best known for The Blair Witch Project
 Gregg Hale (musician) (born 1977), best known as the guitarist for the British band Spiritualized
 Gregg Harper (born 1956), American politician
 Gregg Hughes (born 1963), American talk radio broadcaster better known as Opie on The Opie and Anthony Show
 Gregg Jakobson (born 1939), American songwriting partner of Dennis Wilson of The Beach Boys, witness in the murder trials of members of the Manson Family
 Gregg Landaker (born 1951), American re-recording mixer, three-time Academy Award winner
 Gregg Olsen (born 1959), American writer
 Gregg Olson (born 1966), American former Major League Baseball relief pitcher
 Gregg Phillips, former head of the Mississippi Department of Human Services
 Gregg Popovich (born 1949), American National Basketball Association head coach
 Gregg Rolie (born 1947), American singer, keyboardist and organist, lead singer and co-founder of the bands Santana, Journey and Abraxas Pool, member of the Rock and Roll Hall of Fame
 Gregg Rudloff (born 1955), American re-recording mixer, three-time Academy Award winner
 Gregg Sulkin (born 1992), British actor
 Gregg Takayama (born 1952), American politician
 Gregg Wallace (born 1964), English television presenter
 Gregg Wattenberg, American songwriter, music producer and musician
 Gregg Zuckerman (born 1949), American mathematician

See also
 R. Gregg Cherry (1891-1957), Governor of North Carolina
 Greg, another masculine given name

Masculine given names
Hypocorisms